John Joseph Jones (8 December 1873 – 21 November 1941), was a Labour Party Member of Parliament (MP).

Born in Nenagh, Co Tipperary, Jones moved to London where he worked as a builders' labourer.  He joined the Social Democratic Federation (SDF) and was elected to West Ham Council in 1904.

In the 1906 general election, Jones unsuccessfully stood for Camborne.  In 1911, he became a trade union organiser, for the National Union of General Workers.

In the 1914 Poplar by-election, Jones stood unsuccessfully for the British Socialist Party (BSP) - the successor of the SDF.

As a supporter of World War I, he joined the National Socialist Party split from the BSP, which soon affiliated to the Labour Party.

In the Coupon election, he stood against an official Labour candidate in Silvertown - the official candidate being an anti-war supporter of the Independent Labour Party.

He became one of several National Socialist Party candidates elected, but the only one who stood for the party, rather than for the Labour Party. Despite this, he took the Labour Party whip in 1919.

Jones was described by Time Magazine as "the wittiest man in the House of Commons". He held his seat in each election until he resigned in February 1940. He died the following year.

He was a keen football and cricket fan, and his autobiography was entitled My Lively Life.

References

External links 
 

1873 births
1941 deaths
British Socialist Party members
British trade unionists
Labour Party (UK) MPs for English constituencies
GMB (trade union)-sponsored MPs
Politicians from County Tipperary
Social Democratic Federation members
UK MPs 1918–1922
UK MPs 1922–1923
UK MPs 1923–1924
UK MPs 1924–1929
UK MPs 1929–1931
UK MPs 1931–1935
UK MPs 1935–1945
People from Nenagh